Sascha Korb (born 18 June 1993) is a German professional footballer who plays as a midfielder for VfR Aalen.

Career
Korb made his professional debut for Kickers Offenbach in the 3. Liga on 13 April 2013, coming on as a substitute in the 68th minute for Jan Washausen in a 1–0 home loss against Preußen Münster.

References

External links
 
 
 Kickers Offenbach II statistics at Fussball.de
 

1993 births
Living people
Sportspeople from Offenbach am Main
Footballers from Hesse
German footballers
Association football midfielders
Kickers Offenbach players
KSV Hessen Kassel players
Wormatia Worms players
1. FC Schweinfurt 05 players
SC Verl players
VfR Aalen players
3. Liga players
Regionalliga players